Han Ji-hwan (born 5 August 1977) is a Korean former judoka who competed in the 2000 Summer Olympics. He now owns a studio titled Han Martial Arts in Oakland, California.

References

1977 births
Living people
Olympic judoka of South Korea
Judoka at the 2000 Summer Olympics
Yong In University alumni
Sportspeople from South Jeolla Province
South Korean male judoka